The Swedish National Debt Office ( or shortly Riksgälden) was founded by Gustav III at the Riksdag of the Estates in 1789, through the Act of union and security. It is a Swedish Government agency. The first task of the Debt Office was to finance the ongoing War against Russia.

The method of raising funds was to issue promissory notes called Riksgälds denominated in Riksdaler which was the Swedish currency at the time. The reason why the funds could not be raised through the Riksbank was that its notes had to be backed by silver (commodity money) to two thirds, whereas no such restrictions applied for the promissory notes (credit money) issued by the Debt office. This produced a heavy seigniorage-induced inflation, where the exchange rate for the promissory notes against silver was 1 to 4 in 1834.

In 1989, after two hundred years as one of the few state agencies that reported directly to the Riksdag, the Debt office was reconstituted and is now reporting to the Ministry of Finance and the Government. After 1989 it also assumed the role as the government's internal bank from the Riksbank.

Since January 1, 2008 the Debt office handles the Swedish deposit insurance, which 1996-2007 was handled by a separate governmental agency.

Since 2022 the Swedish National Debt Office is headed by Director General Karolina Ekholm, PhD in economics.

Directors-general
1945-1950 - Fredrik Emanuel Sandberg
1950-1961 - Sten Widlund
1961-1977 - Karl Georg Ringström
1977-1987 - Lars Kalderén
1988-1995 - Staffan Crona
1995-2004 - Thomas Franzén
2004-2013 - Bo Lundgren
2013–2022 - Hans Lindblad
2022–     - Karolina Ekholm

See also 

Scandinavian Monetary Union
Krona
Economy of Sweden
Monetary policy of Sweden

External links
Webpage of the Swedish National Debt Office 

Economy of Sweden
Debt Office
Public finance of Sweden